Victor Sebastian Costache (born 18 March 1974) was the Minister of Health of Romania from 4 November 2019 to 26 March 2020 when he resigned in the midst of the COVID-19 pandemic in Romania. He was succeeded as Minister of Health by Nelu Tătaru.

Born in Iași, he studied from 1992 at the Alexandru Ioan Cuza University in the city, graduating in 1999 with an MD degree from the Grigore T. Popa University of Medicine and Pharmacy. He did his residency in Romania and France, with specialization in cardiovascular and thoracic surgery. After working for over 10 years in hospitals in France, Great Britain, Denmark, Scotland, Germany, Quebec, and the United States, Costache decided to return to Romania in 2014, becoming an Associate Professor at the Lucian Blaga University of Sibiu.

Since 2015 he is President of the Cardiovascular Surgery Commission at the Ministry of Health. He is also a member of the French Society of Thoracic and Cardiovascular Surgery.

See also
 Orban Cabinet

References

Living people
1974 births
21st-century Romanian politicians
Romanian surgeons
Politicians from Iași
Alexandru Ioan Cuza University alumni
Grigore T. Popa University of Medicine and Pharmacy alumni
Romanian Ministers of Health
Physicians from Iași
Academic staff of the Lucian Blaga University of Sibiu